Bekir Osmanov (22 March 1911  26 May 1983) was a Crimean Tatar civil rights activist, agronomist, and partisan.

Early life 
Osmanov was born in Crimea on 22 March 1911 in Buyuk Ozenbash village. His father, who was a teacher at a local madrassah, died in 1915, leaving their mother Khaniapte a widow with five children to raise. Growing up in extreme poverty, the children began working from a very young age, processing coal and tending to crops. When he was six to seven years old he suffered from smallpox with a prolonged high fever, and was not expected to survive, but lived through it. He grew up to be a studious child, and eventually his family sent him to Yalta to attend agricultural school. In 1935 he married fellow student Mariya Gushchinskaya, a Belorussian. During the purges of 1937, Osmanov, by then a tobacco farmer, was arrested and tried for rebutting Lysenkoist pseudoscience, but the court spared him after the judge issued a statement that legal action was an inappropriate way to handle academic disputes. Before the war his wife gave birth to their daughter Tamila and first son Yuri; for their safety, they were evacuated from the peninsula to Azerbaijan before German troops completely took over the peninsula.

Partisan activities 
Growing wary of the imminent German occupation of Crimea, Osmanov insisted that collective farms in Crimea harvest their crops early and prepare to defend themselves for the ensuing war, but was berated by a local official for sharing his sober analysis of the situation. He then attended brief combat training courses in which he learned to accurately fire a revolver and throw grenades. However, he was not drafted into the Red Army for health reasons, so he put his skills to use as a scout with the partisan movement to help resist the Nazi occupation of the peninsula. His first mission was to deliver a radio to a group of partisans located deep within the forest. He went on to participate in other various partisan operations, for which he gained a reputation as skilled scout due to his knowledge of the local geography, and in January 1942 he was accepted into the Community Party. For his effective work as a partisan and scout, the Nazi occupiers launched a wide search for him and offered a bounty of 100,000 marks on his head. He was twice nominated for the Order of Lenin, but Vladimir Bulatov obstructed the award on both occasions. With Kuibyshev detachment having suffered heavy losses and unable to continue on, he was transferred to the Sevastopol detachment, where he became a political instructor and took part in more risky operations. In October 1942 he took part in a small-scale sea-based operation, helping fellow partisans hide in "blind spots" from enemy forces to approach the coast; however, the operation was a failure, with the commander and commissar panicking upon the start of enemy fire and several partisans drowning due to their boats being shelled. Nevertheless, Osmanov and the rest of the partisans maintained their composure and continued for Cape Kikeneiz, where they landed and made their way to the forest. However, his work as a partisan did not last much longer; later that month he sustained severe shrapnel wounds from a mine, and so he was evacuated from Crimea on 26 October 1942.

Later life 
Originally taken to Sochi, he was soon transferred to a hospital in Sukhumi, where he remained until reuniting with his family in Aghdam. He then moved to Krasnodar, where the Crimean Regional Committee in exile was located before returning to Crimea as soon as Nazi forces were expelled from the peninsula in April 1944. Upon return to Crimea he was appointed first deputy commissar of regional agriculture and started to draw up a plan for development of local agriculture in the war-torn peninsula, he did not remain in Crimea for very long; since he was a Crimean Tatar, he was deported from Crimea on 18 May 1944 and sent to Central Asia. Initially he was to the Pakhta Uchun Kurash collective farm, but he was allowed to move to a state farm in Ferghana where his wife and children were deported to. In exile he worked in agriculture, eventually getting a job at nursery, where he developed several pear varieties.

Slander from Vergasov 
Ilya Vergasov, a Russian writer controversial for taking extreme creative liberties in his memoirs, falsely depicted Osmanov as a German spy that was eventually shot for treason in one of the early editions of his book In the Mountains of Tavria;  Osmanov had faithfully served the partisan movement and been evacuated from Crimea for medical reasons in 1942. Soon after the book's publication he became aware of the slanderous depiction of him in the book and publicly rebuked it. Eventually many of Vergasov's outlandish claims and contradictions became the subject of closer scrutiny, resulting in the slanderous fabrications being removed in later editions published after the content of the books was scrutinized by the central committee and other Crimean partisans who noticed Vergasov's lies.

Crimean Tatar rights activism 
With a secure job and having a reputation as a respected agronomist and war veteran, he became an active campaigner for Crimean Tatar civil rights and one of the co-founders of the original movement, frequently meeting with other prominent Crimean Tatars in exile including Mustafa Selimov and Dzhebbar Akimov to discuss the issue. Despite his strong communist beliefs, he was eventually expelled from the Communist Party in 1966 for a letter to Brezhnev highlighting the Crimean Tatar plight and outlining the proper Leninist recourse in the form of permitting right of return to previous places of residence in Crimea, restoration of the Crimean ASSR, political rehabilitation of the Crimean Tatar nation, reparations, among other reconciliatory measures. In that era, such attitudes and activism were highly frowned upon by the party, which pursued a policy of demanding that "People of Tatar nationality who formerly lived in Crimea" remain in Asia instead of desiring a return to Crimea, much to the discontent of the majority of Crimean Tatars. His son Yuri Osmanov followed in his footsteps and became a prominent leader of the Crimean Tatar civil rights movement in later years.

Return to Crimea 
Bekir Osmanov decided to return to Crimea and face the barrage of challenges in doing so after his wife Mariya died in 1974; her funeral was attended by many Crimean Tatars in diaspora, some of whom even travelled from Nukus to pay their respects in the ceremony in Fergana. Upon his return to Crimea he obtained a house in Dmitrovo but initially he was denied a residence permit, a major barrier to right of return for exiled Crimean Tatars. Only after living in Crimea illegally for a year and a half was he granted a residence permit. He lived there for the remainder of his life and suffered from quite poor health for those years before he eventually died on 26 May 1983, shortly after his son Yuri was sentenced to three years in prison for activism. After he died authorities approached his other son Artyom, offering to help pay for the funeral if they kept it small; Artyom rejected the proposal, the family held a huge funeral attended by many Crimean Tatars, but Yuri was not granted a release from prison to attend it. He was buried in Donskoye (Besh-Terek) next to Musa Mamut.

References

1911 births
1983 deaths
Expelled members of the Communist Party of the Soviet Union
People from Taurida Governorate
Crimean partisans
Crimean Tatar activists
Soviet activists